Maharajganj Lok Sabha constituency is one of the 80 Lok Sabha (parliamentary) constituencies in Uttar Pradesh state in northern India.There is a constituency by the same name in Bihar as well.

Assembly segments
Presently, Maharajganj Lok Sabha constituency comprises five Vidhan Sabha (legislative assembly) segments. These are:

Members of Parliament

•Syed Arshad - Member of Parliament's Representative (1999-2004)

Election results

2019

2014

See also
 Maharajganj
 Maharajganj district
 List of Constituencies of the Lok Sabha

Notes

External links
Maharajganj lok sabha  constituency election 2019 result details

Maharajganj district
Lok Sabha constituencies in Uttar Pradesh